Perl Programming Documentation, also called perldoc, is the name of the user manual for the Perl 5 programming language. It is available in several different formats, including online in HTML and PDF. The documentation is bundled with Perl in its own format, known as Plain Old Documentation (pod). Some distributions, such as Strawberry Perl, include the documentation in HTML, PDF, and pod formats.

perldoc is also the name of the Perl command that provides "access to all the documentation that comes with Perl", from the command line.

See also 
 Outline of Perl – overview of and topical guide to the Perl programming language
 Raku – Perl 5's sister language
 man page – form of software documentation usually found on a Unix or Unix-like operating system, invoked by issuing the man command. Perl documentation is sometimes available as man pages.
 PerlMonks – community website covering all aspects of Perl programming and other related topics such as web applications and system administration. Includes forums where perl users may seek answers to their questions, and answer the questions of others.
 RTFM – Internet slang for "Read the Frickin' Manual"

External links 
 Official documentation for Perl 5 – displays the documentation, and also includes links to download the HTML and PDF files for off-line use.
 The perldoc help page – covers use of the perldoc command
 Perl documentation documentation – documentation about perl's documentation
 Official documentation for Perl 6

 
Software documentation